The Wienerwaldsee (English:Vienna Forest Lake) is a shallow reservoir, located 20 kilometres west of Vienna, Austria.

It is located just north of Austria's main motorway, the West Autobahn, between Tullnerbach and Neu-Purkersdorf. It was created over three years, 1895–1897, by damming the Wienfluss (The Wien) and letting it fill the valley behind. The area around the lake is a nature conservation area. On the northern shore, near the weir, stands the statue of Wilhelm Kress. He was an early pioneer of seaplanes and during testing one of his prototypes sank without trace after hitting debris on the surface. The long distance Westbahn (Western Railway) runs along the northern shore of the lake.

Gallery

References 
 Ulrike Volk, Standsicherheitsbeurteilung des Staudammes "Wienerwaldsee", Hochschulschrift, Universität für Bodenkultur, Wien, Diplom-Arbeit (2000)
 Zisser, Georg, Versuche zur Direktfiltration des Wassers aus dem Wienerwaldsee - Großtechnische Versuche über die Anwendung von Flockungshilfsmitteln in der Flockungseinrichtung des Wientalwasserwerks, Hochschulschrift, Universität für Bodenkultur, Wien, Diplom-Arbeit (1975)

Lakes of Lower Austria
Reservoirs in Austria